Plantsville may refer to:

Plantsville, Connecticut
Plantsville, Ohio